Tetiana Mykolayivna Hryshchenko (born 27 August 1979) is a Ukrainian politician currently serving as a People's Deputy of Ukraine from Ukraine's 66th electoral district since 29 August 2019.

Biography 
Tetiana Mykolayivna Hryshchenko was born on 27 August 1979 in the city of Malyn in Zhytomyr Oblast. She is a graduate of the Malyn Forestry College, specialising in accounting. She worked in the social services of Malyn Raion from 2011 to 2016, and as part of the local electoral commission from 2004 to 2019.

In the 2010 Ukrainian presidential election, Hryshchenko was a member of the district electoral commission representing the campaign of Vasyl Humenyuk. During the 2014 Ukrainian parliamentary election, she represented the Party of Regions, and in the 2019 Ukrainian presidential election, she represented Yuriy Boyko in the first round before representing Volodymyr Zelenskyy in the second round.

In the 2019 Ukrainian parliamentary election, Hryshchenko was a candidate for People's Deputy of Ukraine from Ukraine's 66th electoral district, as a member of Servant of the People. At the time of her election, she was an independent. She was ultimately successful in the election, collecting 28.75% of the vote and defeating the next-closest challenger, former People's Deputy Vitaly Zhuravsky, by a margin of 8.29%.

In the Verkhovna Rada (Ukraine's parliament), Hryshchenko is a member of the Verkhovna Rada Committee on Agriculture and Land Policies. According to information portal Slovo i Dilo, as of February 2021 she had fulfilled only one of her electoral promises (an independent audit of Ukraine's highway system).

References 

1979 births
Living people
Ninth convocation members of the Verkhovna Rada
Servant of the People (political party) politicians
21st-century Ukrainian women politicians
People from Malyn
Women members of the Verkhovna Rada